The 1957–58 Toronto Maple Leafs season was Toronto's 41st season in the National Hockey League (NHL).

Offseason

Regular season

Record vs. opponents

Final standings

Schedule and results

Playoffs

Player statistics

Regular season
Scoring

Goaltending

Awards and records

Transactions

See also
1957–58 NHL season

References

External links

Toronto Maple Leafs season, 1957-58
Toronto Maple Leafs seasons
Tor